Brent Anthony Richards (born May 20, 1990) is an American soccer player who currently plays for Orange County SC in the USL Championship.

Career

High school
Richards played for Camas High School of Camas, WA all four years of his high school career. His most notable year was his fourth and final year, where he led the team to a victory in the WIAA 3A state championship game, alongside future University of Washington teammate Quinton Beasley.

College and amateur
Richards was one of the Pac-10/Pac-12's top scorers during his collegiate career at the University of Washington.  In 72 games for the Huskies, Richards finished with 31 goals, 15 assists and led the Huskies in goals and game-winning goals in each of his four seasons.  Following his senior season, Richards was named First-Team Capital One Academic All-American, 2011 Pac-12 Men's Soccer Scholar-Athlete of the Year and named to the All-West Region first team.

Richards also spent three seasons with Portland Timbers U23s in the USL Premier Development League.  In 2010, Richards led the Timbers U23s to a perfect 16–0 record on the way to the club's first ever USL PDL title.  Richards went on to be named the league's Most Valuable Player and Rookie of the Year that same season.

Professional
On January 4, 2012, Richards signed with MLS club Portland Timbers as their first homegrown player.  On May 30, Richards made his professional debut in a Lamar Hunt U.S. Open Cup match which saw Cal FC upset the Timbers 1–0 in extra time.  He made his league debut on July 14 against the Los Angeles Galaxy. 

Richards spent four seasons with USL Championship side Reno 1868 FC, before Reno folded their team on November 6, 2020, due to the financial impact of the COVID-19 pandemic.

On December 17, 2020, Richards joined USL Championship side Orange County SC ahead of their 2021 season.

Honors

Portland Timbers U23s
 USL Premier Development League Championship (1): 2010

Individual
 USL Premier Development League MVP (1): 2010
 USL Premier Development League Rookie of the Year: 2010

References

External links
 
 
 
 

1990 births
Living people
American soccer players
Washington Huskies men's soccer players
Portland Timbers U23s players
Portland Timbers players
Portland Timbers 2 players
Reno 1868 FC players
Association football forwards
Soccer players from Oregon
University of Washington alumni
USL League Two players
Major League Soccer players
USL Championship players
Homegrown Players (MLS)
Orange County SC players